Sarah Powers Bradish (1867–1922) was an American writer. She is known for her textbook "Old Norse Stories," published in 1900, and a memoir titled "... Stories of Country Life."

Sarah Powers Bradish is also known for her service as Wisconsin State Secretary of the Woman's Christian Temperance Union.

She was a graduate of Ripon College and traveled extensively in Europe. 
She traveled in England and France from 1872–73. She resided in Dartford, Wisconsin from 1873–74; in Ripon, Wisconsin from 1874–75; and in Minneapolis, Minnesota from 1875–94.

Her husband, James H. Bradish, also attended Ripon College. He became assistant general solicitor of the Minneapolis, St. Paul & Sault Ste. Marie Railroad Company, and a Minneapolis alderman. The couple had two children, Bertha and Herman.

Works

References

1867 births
1922 deaths
Writers from Minneapolis
Ripon College (Wisconsin) alumni
American temperance activists